St. Arkansas is the 12th studio album by Pere Ubu, released in 2002.

Critical reception
The A.V. Club wrote that the album "is one of Pere Ubu's best works, displaying the kind of intelligence and imagination that gives the avant-garde a good name." AllMusic wrote that the band's "lyrical and musical creativity is undiminished by time." Pitchfork called the album "more subdued and less rock-oriented, relying more on beat-style spoken-word storytelling and found sound." The East Bay Express called it "consistently fine" and "full of spidery electric guitar, wry, deadpan singing, and loping, haunted, and haunting rhythms." CMJ New Music Monthly wrote that the band "remains a challenging but rewarding listen, uncannily able to move forward while preserving its unmistakable vibe."

Track listing
"The Fevered Dream of Hernando DeSoto"  – 2:45
"Slow Walking Daddy"  – 4:52
"Michele"  – 3:11
"333"  – 3:59
"Hell"  – 5:12
"Lisbon"  – 3:30
"Steve"  – 2:48
"Phone Home Jonah"  – 2:39
"Where's the Truth"  – 3:25
"Dark"  – 9:16

Personnel
Pere Ubu
David Thomas - vocals
Tom Herman - guitar, organ, backing vocals
Robert Wheeler - EML synthesizer, theremin, piano
Michele Temple - bass, piano, organ
Steve Mehlman - drums, organ
with:
Jim Jones - organ, guitar
Technical
Paul Hamann - engineer
John Thompson - design

References 

Pere Ubu albums
2002 albums
Cooking Vinyl albums